Hanoi Beer is a beer brand produced in Hanoi, Vietnam. It is a brand of Habeco, a state company that is partially owned by Carlsberg.

The logo shows the One Pillar Pagoda flanked by two bears.

External links
Habeco official website

References

Hanoi
Beer in Vietnam
Beer brands
Vietnamese brands